July 10 - Eastern Orthodox Church calendar - July 12

All fixed commemorations below are celebrated on July 24 by Old Calendar.

For July 11th, Orthodox Churches on the Old Calendar commemorate the Saints listed on June 28.

Saints
 Hieromartyr Cindeus the Presbyter, of Pamphylia (283-305) 
 Martyr Marcian, by the sword.   (see also: July 13)
 Martyr Martyrocles, shot with arrows.
 Martyrs Januarius and Pelagia, of Nicopolis in Armenia (c. 310) 
 Commemoration of the Miracle (451) of Great-martyr Euphemia the All-praised, of Chalcedon (304)  
 Blessed Equal-to-the-Apostles Olga, Princess of Russia, named Helen in holy baptism (969) 
 Venerable Leo, monk, of Mandra (of the Sheepfold).
 Saint Arsenius of Alexandria, martyred Patriarch of Alexandria (1010)

Pre-Schism Western saints
 Saint Pius I, Pope of Rome from c.142 to c.155  (c. 155) 
 Saint Sidronius, a martyr in Rome under Aurelian (c. 270) 
 Saint Sabinus (Savinus) and Cyprian, two martyrs and brothers venerated in Brescia in Italy.
 Saint Sabinus, a saint venerated near Poitiers in France, said to have been a disciple of St Germanus of Auxerre, confessor (5th century)
 Saint Leontius II (the Younger), a soldier who served against the Visigoths, he became Bishop of Bordeaux and participated in the Council of Paris of 553 (c. 565)
 Saint Drostan, founder and first Abbot of Old Deer in Aberdeenshire (c. 610) 
 Saint Amabilis (Mable), daughter of an English noble, she became a nun at Saint-Amand in Rouen in France (c. 634)
 Saints Sigisbert and Placid, founders of Disentis Abbey (c. 650 or c. 750) 
 Saint John of Bergamo, Bishop of Bergamo, renowned for his learning and great success in fighting Arianism (c. 690) 
 Saint Hidulf (Hidulphus), founder of Moyenmoutier Abbey, and reputed Bishop of Trier (707) 
 Saint  Abundius of Cordoba, Hieromartyr of Córdoba, Spain (854) 
 Saint Thurketyl (Turketil), the brother of King Edred of England, he became Abbot of Crowland and also of Bedford Abbey (975)

Post-Schism Orthodox saints
 Venerable Nicodemus of Hilandar and Vatopedi, Mount Athos, instructor of St. Gregory Palamas (1320)
 New Martyr Nicodemus of Elbasan and Mount Athos (1722)
 New Monk-martyr Nectarius of St. Anne’s Skete, Mount Athos, at Vryoulla, Ephesus (1820)
 Venerbale Cyril the New, monk, of Paros (1833)

New martyrs and confessors
 New Hieromartyrs, Priests, of Serbia (1941-1945):
 Momcilo Grgurevic, Dobroslav Blazenovic, Milan Bozic, Mihailo Djusic, Jovan Zecevic, Bozidar Jovic, Bogdan Lalic, Trifun Maksimovic, Velimir Mijatovic, Bozidar Minic, Miladin Minic, Marko Popovic, Dimitrije Rajanovic, Budimir Sokolovic, Relja Spahic, Lazar Culibrk, Savo Siljac, Savo Skaljka, Milorad Vukojicic, Ratomir Jankovic, Mihailo Jevdjevic, Dusan Prijovic, Dobrosav Sokovic, Nestor Trkulja, Serafim Dzaric, Andrija Siljak, Slobodan Siljak, and Jovan Rapajic.
 Venerable Archimandrite Sophrony (Sakharov) of Essex (1993) (see also: June 28)

Other commemorations
 Translation of the relics of Venerable Benedict of Nursia, writer of the Rule of Saint Benedict (c. 547)  (see also: March 14 )
 Transfer of the Relics of Great-martyr Barbara to Kiev, by Barbara of Byzantium (d. 1125), third wife of Sviatopolk II of Kiev.
 Icon of the Mother of God of Rzhevsk (1539)
 Uncovering of the relics (1677) of Venerable Arkadius of Vyazemsk and Novotorzhsk (1077) 
 Uncovering of the relics (1998) of Hieromartyr Hilarion, Archbishop of Verey (1929)
 Repose of cave-dweller Anastasia of St. Cornelius of Padan Hermitage, in Olonets (1901)

Icon gallery

Notes

References

Sources
 July 11/July 24. Orthodox Calendar (PRAVOSLAVIE.RU).
 July 24 / July 11. HOLY TRINITY RUSSIAN ORTHODOX CHURCH (A parish of the Patriarchate of Moscow).
 July 11. OCA - The Lives of the Saints.
 July 11. The Year of Our Salvation - Holy Transfiguration Monastery, Brookline, Massachusetts. 
 The Autonomous Orthodox Metropolia of Western Europe and the Americas (ROCOR). St. Hilarion Calendar of Saints for the year of our Lord 2004. St. Hilarion Press (Austin, TX). p. 51.
 The Eleventh Day of the Month of July. Orthodoxy in China.
 July 11. Latin Saints of the Orthodox Patriarchate of Rome.
 The Roman Martyrology. Transl. by the Archbishop of Baltimore. Last Edition, According to the Copy Printed at Rome in 1914. Revised Edition, with the Imprimatur of His Eminence Cardinal Gibbons. Baltimore: John Murphy Company, 1916. p. 203.
 Rev. Richard Stanton. A Menology of England and Wales, or, Brief Memorials of the Ancient British and English Saints Arranged According to the Calendar, Together with the Martyrs of the 16th and 17th Centuries. London: Burns & Oates, 1892. p. 330.
Greek Sources
 Great Synaxaristes:  11 ΙΟΥΛΙΟΥ. ΜΕΓΑΣ ΣΥΝΑΞΑΡΙΣΤΗΣ.
  Συναξαριστής. 11 Ιουλίου. ECCLESIA.GR. (H ΕΚΚΛΗΣΙΑ ΤΗΣ ΕΛΛΑΔΟΣ). 
  11/07/2018. Ορθόδοξος Συναξαριστής. 
Russian Sources
  24 июля (11 июля). Православная Энциклопедия под редакцией Патриарха Московского и всея Руси Кирилла (электронная версия). (Orthodox Encyclopedia - Pravenc.ru).
  11 июля по старому стилю / 24 июля по новому стилю. СПЖ "Союз православных журналистов". 2018.
  11 июля (ст.ст.) 24 июля 2014 (нов. ст.). Русская Православная Церковь Отдел внешних церковных связей. (DECR).

July in the Eastern Orthodox calendar